Japanese bitter orange may refer to:
 Poncirus trifoliata: Trifoliate orange, hardy orange, Chinese bitter orange
 Citrus ×daidai (Daidai): variety of bitter orange (Citrus ×aurantium), 
 Aegle marmelos: bael/bili/bhel, Bengal quince, golden apple, stone apple, wood apple